The  Asian Men's Volleyball Championship was the seventeenth staging of the Asian Men's Volleyball Championship, a biennial international volleyball tournament organised by the Asian Volleyball Confederation (AVC) with United Arab Emirates Volleyball Association (UAEVA). The tournament was held in Doha, United Arab Emirates from 28 September to 6 October 2013.

Venues

Pools composition
The teams are distributed according to their position in the FIVB World Rankings as of 23 January, 2013.

* Jordan, Indonesia and Pakistan withdrew, Uzbekistan moved to Pool A to balance the number of teams in each pool.

Preliminary round

Pool A

|}

|}

Pool B

|}

|}

Pool C

|}

|}

Pool D

|}

|}

Pool E

|}

|}

Pool F

|}

|}

Pool G

|}

|}

Pool H

|}

|}

Classification 17th–21st

Quarterfinals

|}

Semifinals

|}

19th place

|}

17th place

|}

Classification round
 The results and the points of the matches between the same teams that were already played during the preliminary round shall be taken into account for the classification round.

Pool I

|}

|}

Pool J

|}

|}

Pool K

|}

|}

Pool L

|}

|}

Classification 9th–16th

Quarterfinals

|}

13th–16th semifinals

|}

9th–12th semifinals

|}

15th place

|}

13th place

|}

11th place

|}

9th place

|}

Final round

Quarterfinals

|}

5th–8th semifinals

|}

Semifinals

|}

7th place

|}

5th place

|}

3rd place

|}

Final

|}

Final standing

Awards
MVP:  Saeid Marouf
Best Scorer:  Zhong Weijun
Best Spiker:  Amir Ghafour
Best Blocker:  Mohammad Mousavi
Best Server:  Zhong Weijun
Best Setter:  Saeid Marouf
Best Libero:  Farhad Zarif

References

External links
Regulations
Squads

A
Asian men's volleyball championships
V
V